The Valea Dolii is a right tributary of the river Arieșul Mic in Romania. It discharges into the Arieșul Mic in Ponorel.

References

Rivers of Romania
Rivers of Alba County